James Moeller (November 14, 1933 – July 16, 2019) was an American lawyer and jurist who served as a justice of the Arizona Supreme Court for eleven years from 1987 to 1998.

Moeller was a native of Valley, Nebraska. He graduated from Valley High School and received a Bachelor of Arts degree from Nebraska Wesleyan University in 1954. He served in the Army for two years after graduation. He received a law degree from George Washington University in Washington, D.C., in 1959 and joined the Phoenix law firm of Lewis, Roca, Scoville, Beauchamp and Linton. In 1970, Moeller formed his own Phoenix law firm.  He was a judge of the Maricopa County Superior Court for the ten years prior to his appointment to the Supreme Court by Governor Evan Mecham.

References

1933 births
2019 deaths
George Washington University Law School alumni
Justices of the Arizona Supreme Court
Military personnel from Nebraska
Nebraska lawyers
Nebraska Wesleyan University alumni
People from Douglas County, Nebraska
United States Army soldiers